The Sleepers is the name of several fictional characters appearing in American comic books published by Marvel Comics. The Sleepers are depicted as five destructive robots created by the Red Skull.

Fictional character biography
The Sleepers were five doomsday robots designed in Berlin by Nazi Germany as agents of destruction. After World War II, the Fourth Sleeper was entombed within a crypt that was sunk into the sea. The first three robots were activated by agents at a certain time in European villages, consisting of a giant human-like robot with blaster rays, a winged robot, and the 'brain', which resembled the Red Skull and was a powerful bomb. Despite Captain America and the personnel of a nearby U.S. Army base's attempts to stop them, the robots combined and flew towards the North Pole. While in pursuit with the military, Captain America surmises that the first Sleeper would use its blasts to dig into the ice, enabling the robot to travel into the Earth and explode, destroying the world, as the Red Skull had vowed that if he could not conquer the world, he would destroy it. To prevent this, Captain America is able to board the combined vehicle in midair and detonate the bomb early with a flamethrower, destroying the three Sleepers. The crypt containing the Fourth Sleeper was retrieved from the sea in modern times, and when the Sleeper reactivated it destroyed a seacoast smelting factory and battled Captain America. The Sleeper was ultimately rendered intangible by a "sonic crystal". Similarly, the Red Skull later activated the Fifth Sleeper, only to have it stopped by Captain America and the Falcon as well.

The Fourth Sleeper was later restored to tangibility by the Machinesmith and used as a "Trojan horse" to gain entrance onto Avengers Island to liberate the various robots incarcerated there. It was thwarted by Captain America, and badly damaged.

The damage done to the Fourth Sleeper was later repaired by the Machinesmith. The Fourth Sleeper was animated by the Machinesmith to join the Skeleton Crew in search of the missing Red Skull. It battled Hellfire Club mercenaries, and the Black Queen. Replicas of the five Sleeper robots were then pitted against Captain America and Diamondback.

Powers and abilities
The Fourth Sleeper's robotic materials, design, and construction provide it with superhuman strength, stamina, durability, and reflexes.  It possesses a limited artificial intelligence, with a capacity for limited self-motivated activity. The Fourth Sleeper is programmed to be moderately proficient at hand-to-hand combat. The Fourth Sleeper has repulsor-ray blasters mounted in its eyesockets.

Originally, the Fourth Sleeper could alter its density from its natural tempered steel form to total intangibility. The circuits that controlled this function have burned out and have not been replaced. The vibration of a certain "sonic crystal" caused the Fourth Sleeper's intangibility control to malfunction. The Fourth Sleeper originally could also generate "volcanic" thermal energy and project it through its faceplate. This function has also apparently been eradicated.

In other media

Television
 The original Sleeper appears in the "Captain America" segment of The Marvel Super Heroes.
 A Sleeper robot appeared in the X-Men: The Animated Series episode "Old Soldiers".
 Robots of a similar design to the Sleepers appeared in the Spider-Man episode "Six Forgotten Warriors". They were created to protect the Red Skull's "doomsday weapon".
 Multiple Sleepers appear in The Avengers: Earth's Mightiest Heroes episode "Winter Soldier". A Sleeper attacks the Avengers' Hydro-Base to break out the Red Skull. While Captain America and Nick Fury are looking for the Winter Soldier, they find him fighting a Sleeper and help him defeat it. Afterward, the Winter Soldier tells them the Sleepers were activated after the Avengers foiled the Red Skull's campaign as Dell Rusk. Five Sleepers are activated in Washington D.C. and combine into one Mega-Sleeper to destroy it. However, the Avengers are able to distract it while Captain America and the Winter Soldier confront the Red Skull as he is piloting the robot. Their resulting fight damages the Mega-Sleeper, allowing the Avengers to destroy it.
 A variation of the Sleeper appears in the Avengers Assemble episode "The Sleeper Awakens", voiced by Liam O'Brien. This version is the Red Skull's A.I. system, referred to as Skull-Net, and battles the New Avengers.
 A variation of the Sleepers known as Sleeper-Mechs appear in season five of Agents of S.H.I.E.L.D., serving as shock troopers for HYDRA leader, USAF General Hale. Introduced in the episode "All the Comforts of Home", they are remote-controlled by Hale's cybernetic associate, Anton Ivanov. He and the Sleeper-Mechs continue to serve Hale until the episode, "The Honeymoon", when S.H.I.E.L.D. agent Elena "Yo-Yo" Rodriguez kills Ivanov, disabling the robots in the process.

Video games
 The Sleeper appears as the final boss in Captain America: Super Soldier. This version was discovered during the Middle Ages by Heller Zemo. Though they did not understand what the Sleeper was, Heller and his men realized it was something important and built Castle Zemo around its resting place. Hundreds of years later, during World War II, Heller's descendant Heinrich Zemo acquired the castle, believing he was destined to awaken the Sleeper and use it to help him in his plans for world conquest. However, he formed an alliance with HYDRA commander Johann Schmidt, who ousted Heinrich and occupied Castle Zemo so his top scientist Arnim Zola could study the Sleeper for HYDRA's purposes. In 1944, Captain America and the Invaders infiltrate Castle Zemo and successfully destroy the Sleeper after it was activated.

References

Articles about multiple fictional characters
Characters created by Jack Kirby
Characters created by Stan Lee
Marvel Comics robots
Marvel Comics supervillains
Marvel Comics weapons